The 1997 Western Athletic Conference men's basketball tournament was held March 4–8 at the Thomas & Mack Center at the University of Nevada, Las Vegas in Paradise, Nevada.

Top-seeded Utah easily defeated tenth-seeded  in the championship game, 89–68, to clinch their second WAC men's tournament championship.

The Utes, in turn, received an automatic bid to the 1997 NCAA Division I tournament. Utah would ultimately defeat Navy, UNC Charlotte, and Stanford on their way to the Elite Eight, where they lost Kentucky. They were joined in the tournament by Tulsa and New Mexico, who earned at-large bids.

Format
Prior to the 1997 season, the WAC added six new members: Rice, SMU,  San Jose State, TCU, Tulsa, and UNLV. With the additions, total conference membership increased to sixteen teams. The regular season schedule was re-arranged so that teams were placed into one of two eight-team divisions, the Mountain and Pacific Divisions, generally determined by geography.

The tournament field was subsequently expanded from ten to twelve teams, with the top six teams from each of the two divisions qualifying for the tournament. Teams' seeds were determined based on their finish in the standings, and were seeded one to six within their division. The teams who finished in the top two in either of the divisions received byes to the second round while the remaining eight teams were placed in the first round. Each team was initially matched up with a team from the other division (3rd versus 6th and 4th versus 5th).

Bracket

References

WAC men's basketball tournament
Tournament
WAC men's basketball tournament
WAC men's basketball tournament